Gary Tavars (born 15 July 1984) is a French former professional footballer who played as a defender.

Career 
Tavars made one appearance for Hungarian club Budapest Honvéd in the 2009–10 Nemzeti Bajnokság I.

References

1984 births
Living people
Footballers from Paris
French footballers
Association football defenders
Amical de Lucé players
FC Chartres players
FK Chmel Blšany players
FK Baník Most players
Budapest Honvéd FC players
French expatriate footballers
Expatriate footballers in the Czech Republic
Expatriate footballers in Hungary
French expatriate sportspeople in the Czech Republic
French expatriate sportspeople in Hungary